Calleri is an Italian surname. Notable people with the surname include:

 Agustín Calleri (born 1976), Argentine tennis player
 Gianmarco Calleri (born 1942), Italian footballer
 Giuseppe Calleri (1810-1862), Italian-French sinologist and naturalist
 Jonathan Calleri (born 1993), Argentine footballer

Italian-language surnames